The knockout stage of the 2003 FIFA Confederations Cup began on 26 June with the semi-final round, and concluded on 29 June 2003 with the final at Stade de France in Saint-Denis. The top two teams from each group advanced to the knockout stage to compete in a single-elimination style tournament. A third place match was included and played between the two losing teams of the semi-finals.

In the knockout stage (including the final), if a match was level at the end of 90 minutes, extra time of two periods (15 minutes each) would be played. If the score was still level after extra time, the match would be decided by a penalty shoot-out. Additionally, a golden goal rule was used, according to which if the goal is scored during the extra time, the game ends immediately and the scoring team becomes the winner.

Qualified teams

Bracket

Semi-finals

Cameroon v Colombia
The match is remembered for the death of Marc-Vivien Foé. In the 72nd minute of the match, Foé collapsed in the centre circle with no other players near him. After attempts to resuscitate him on the pitch, he was stretchered off the field, where he received mouth-to-mouth resuscitation and oxygen. Medics spent 45 minutes attempting to restart his heart, and although he was still alive upon arrival at the stadium's medical centre, he died shortly afterwards. A first autopsy did not determine an exact cause of death, but a second autopsy concluded that Foé's death was heart-related as it discovered evidence of hypertrophic cardiomyopathy, a hereditary condition known to increase the risk of sudden death during physical exercise.

France v Turkey

Third-place match

Final

References

Knockout
June 2003 sports events
2002–03 in French football
2003 in Cameroonian football
2003 in Colombian football
2002–03 in Turkish football